Believers Eastern Church (previously Believers Church) is an Oriental Protestant Church of Indian origin with congregations and parishes worldwide. It is also a branch of the ministry Gospel for Asia. The church now follows an episcopal governance. The church holds Christ as the head of the Church but also requires that bishops and ordained ministers swear to submit to its metropolitan and any successors of the metropolitan. It is governed by a committee of bishops, the synod, with one central bishop holding the honorary title of "first among equals" and follows Evangelical Christian doctrine. Believers Eastern Church is administratively based in the state of Kerala in southwestern India. In 2015, the church reported it was re-organized into 33 dioceses; a decrease from the 36 dioceses reported by Smith in 2009. According to Believers Eastern Church, it claims its membership consists of more than 3.5 million people in 10 countries speaking a hundred languages. The Church has 30 bishops, and the Metropolitan Bishop is Moran Mor Athanasius Yohan Metropolitan (formerly known as K. P. Yohannan).

History
Believers Eastern Church has its roots in Pentecostalism. The denomination was founded in 1993 as part of the Gospel for Asia apostolate. On 6 February 2003, K. J. Samuel, the Moderator Bishop of the Church of South India (a part of the worldwide Anglican Communion), along with the P.M. Dhotekar, Bishop of Nagpur of the Church of North India, and the Bancha Nidhi Nayak, Bishop of Phulbani of the Church of North India, consecrated Moran Mor Athanasius Yohan Metropolitan (formerly known as K. P. Yohannan) as a bishop in Anglican lines of apostolic succession; K.P. Yohannan thereafter became the first metropolitan of the Believers Eastern Church, and acquired an episcopal polity of ecclesiastical governance. Believers Eastern Church describes itself as being "Apostolic in origin, universal in nature, Biblical and evangelical in faith, ecumenical in outlook". It adheres to the Nicene Creed, biblical faith, and traditions of the historical church backed up with its own canonical constitution.  The Episcopal Synod and the diocesan councils take the responsibility for planning and executing the mission, religious life and charitable programs of the Church. The Believers Eastern Church is divided as regions into dioceses, each with its own bishop. Each local church has members ranging from less than one hundred to a thousand with an average of hundred, and the number of parishes themselves are increasing. The Believers Eastern Church is divided into various dioceses under the leadership of a diocesan bishop or a vicar-general.

In 2009, the church ordained seven bishops. On 2 March 2017, Moran Mor Athanasius Yohan Metropolitan (formerly known as K. P. Yohannan) consecrated twelve bishops for the Believers Eastern Church.

Faith and practice
The liturgy used in Believers Eastern Church "includes prayers, Scripture readings and a confession of the Nicene or Apostles' Creed of the Church." The readings come from the Revised Common Lectionary, which has a three-year cycle; Believers Church observes the liturgical kalendar of Western Christianity, thus keeping Lent, for example. Believers Church administers the sacraments of Baptism and Holy Communion. Communicants of Believers Eastern Church use the sign of the cross in their prayers.

Beliefs
The church accepts the Old Testament and New Testament of the Bible as the inspired Word of God which is inerrant and the fundamental standard of faith, and complete and final written revelation of God. It also adheres to the Nicene Creed. The church believes in the following doctrines:
 One eternal God revealed in the trinity: Father, Son and Holy Spirit.
 The divinity and humanity of Jesus Christ, his virgin birth, sinless life, crucifixion and resurrection, ascension and intercession of Holy Spirit.
 The outpouring of the Holy Spirit upon believers in Jerusalem after Jesus’ ascension, enabling them to preach the Gospel to the whole world.
 Separation of all mankind from God through man's sin.
 Immediate forgiveness of sins through repentance and acceptance of Jesus Christ.
 The person and work of indwelling and empowerment of the Holy Spirit through baptism for all believers.
 The practice of gifts of the Holy Spirit within scriptural guidelines for the common good; Considers that agape love is more important than all the gifts, and without it, all exercise of spiritual gifts as worthless.
 Jesus Christ as the head of the church.
 The second coming of Jesus Christ and it will be personal and visible, which motivates active involvement of the laity in church activities.
 The resurrection of the body unto eternal life for the saved and unto eternal separation for the lost; But salvation, redemption and forgiveness are freely offered to all by the grace of our Lord Jesus Christ.

Core values
For being distinguishable members of Believers Eastern church, and the message of the Word of God to be applied in an individual's life leading to a greater maturity in Christ, following are the official code of living.
 Knowing the Lord Jesus more fully and intimately.
 Being a people of integrity and excellence.
 Living in submission to God's Word.
 Being a people of faith.
 Being a people committed to prayer and worship.
 Having a servant lifestyle.
 Being a people of grace and love.
 Serving sacrificially.
 Being a people with passion for souls.
 Being a people who work together with the Body of Christ.

Religious orders
The Sisters of Compassion is a religious order of nuns within Believers Church that is dedicated to serving the "neglected of society".

Humanitarian services

Believers Eastern Church is involved in various social projects and has been lauded for "its humanitarian service towards the society at large." The church's social service includes poverty alleviation, and promoting adult literacy. The church is also providing shelter to street children through a home called Asha Grih, which is licensed by the Indian Government. Additionally, Believers Eastern Church has a child development project called Bridge of Hope (BOH). BOH provides holistic development to needy children throughout South Asia. As of 2012, the project is helping 60,000 underprivileged children by providing them free education, a nutritious diet and school supplies. Bridge of Hope's 525 project centers are staffed by 2,400 individuals. Other major projects include the Believers Church Medical College Hospital, Believers Eastern Church Caarmel Engineering College and Believers Church Theological Seminary. Most of the funds for these social projects are sent over from the United States by the ministry Gospel for Asia, of which Believers Church is a part. The metropolitan of Believers Church, Moran Mor Athanasius Yohan Metropolitan (formerly known as K. P. Yohannan), is also the president of Gospel for Asia.

Criticisms
The operations of Gospel for Asia and Believers Eastern Church were scrutinized after Believers Eastern Church, under the guidance of Moran Mor Athanasius Yohan Metropolitan purchased a  rubber estate in Kerala, India.

 
Opponents said the church had diverted foreign funds to amass land for itself and for uses other than declared purposes.
 
Further, it was alleged that the rubber estate, which Believers Eastern Church purchased from Harrison's Malayalam Ltd., was on leasehold from the government and not saleable.
 
Legal proceedings are still ongoing.

There is also been an ongoing court case regarding the illegal filling in of wetlands in order to build the Believers Eastern Church Medical College Hospital.

Moran Mor Athanasius Yohan Metropolitan says that the claims were politically motivated and that the workings of Gospel for Asia and Believers Eastern Church are transparent. Further, the rubber estate is an investment to help fund social service activities among underdeveloped communities and not a personal land grab as opponents have stated.

In 2017, the Ministry of Home Affairs had suspended the Foreign Contribution Regulation Act (FCRA) licences of the church and three NGOs associated with Believers Eastern Church from receiving foreign funds.
  
It is mandatory to have FCRA clearance from the Home Ministry for any organisation to receive foreign funds. The trust enjoyed exemption under the I-T Act, 1961 as charitable/religious trust, received donations from foreign countries ostensibly for helping the poor and destitute and  evangelical purposes. 
The government has reconsidered the decision to allow prior permission to two NGOs after details verification.

In 2020, the Income Tax officials conducted searches at around 60 premises associated with the  Believers Church.
 
The I-T officials seized Rs 14.5 cr from the raid at the offices of Believers church. Out of the total amount, Rs 7 cr was recovered from the boot of a car owned by an employee of the hospital under Believers church. Rest of the amount was seized from various places including Delhi.
 
I-T officials revealed that they are looking into transactions over the last ten years. The church had got around Rs 4,000 crore over the years and a chunk of it had gone into the construction of institutions and real estate dealings.

Ecumenical relations
Believers Eastern Church is a member of the Kerala Council of Churches.
The Believers Eastern Church has also held ecumenical contacts with the Anglican Church in North America.  In addition, Gospel For Asia frequently has and continues to solicit funding from evangelical churches, but does not disclose that Yohannan is a metropolitan, as most evangelical churches are congregational or elder-led and generally oppose a hierarchal structure with one person at the top (such as the Roman Catholic or the various Orthodox bodies).

See also 

 History of Pentecostalism in India
 Believers Church Airport

References

External links
 Website of Believers Eastern Church (old website)
 Website of Believers Eastern Church (new website)
 Reporter Channel News: Merging of two Christian movements

Religious organizations established in 1993
1993 establishments in India
Pentecostalism in India
Evangelical denominations in Asia
Pentecostal denominations in Asia